Caryodendreae is a tribe of plant of the family Euphorbiaceae. It contains 3 genera.

See also
 Taxonomy of the Euphorbiaceae

References

Acalyphoideae
Euphorbiaceae tribes